Kunturiri (Aymara kunturi condor, -(i)ri a suffix, also spelled Condoriri) is a  mountain in the Bolivian Andes. It is located in the Chuquisaca Department, Nor Cinti Province, San Lucas Municipality. It lies northwest of Turu Punta.

References 

Mountains of Chuquisaca Department